J. J. Murphy may refer to:

 J. J. Murphy (politician)
 J. J. Murphy (actor)
 J.J. Murphy (film director) (born 1947), American filmdirector